Anton Albert Heinrich Ludwig (or Louis) von Wildenbruch (1803–1874) was a Prussian general and diplomat. He served as consul general in Beirut in the mid-19th century. He was also the Prussian ambassador to Constantinople from 1852 to 1859. An amateur scientist, his reports were published in various learned journals of the time.

Wildenbruch was an illegitimate son of Prince Louis Ferdinand of Prussia by Henriette Fromme. In 1837 he married Ernestine von Langen (1805–1858), by whom he had four children who lived to adulthood. Two years after his first wife's death he wed Flora Nicolovius (1811–1879). A son of Wildenbruch's first marriage was the poet and dramatist Ernst von Wildenbruch.

1803 births
1874 deaths
Prussian diplomats
19th-century diplomats
House of Hohenzollern
Lieutenant generals of Prussia